Anna's Swedish Thins or (in Swedish) Annas Pepparkakor is a brand of Swedish ginger thin, produced by the Swedish company AB Annas Pepparkakor in Tyresö outside Stockholm. In November 2008, it was announced that the Belgian company Lotus Bakeries was taking over the company, with the intention of distributing the famous cookies all over Europe.  The thins are marketed as being under Royal Warrant to the King of Sweden.

The company was founded by the sisters Anna and Emma Karlsson in 1929 and has been owned by the Mattsson family since 1963. The company was appointed Purveyor to the Royal Court of Sweden (kunglig hovleverantör) in 2002. 

The ginger thins are available in supermarkets all over Sweden, exported to other countries in Europe, Middle East, and North America. Production was extended to various flavours beside the traditional Swedish ginger flavour, including orange and blueberry.

As of mid-2014, the Swedish thins were imported by Lotus Bakeries North America of San Francisco. The thins are available in ginger, almond, orange, and chocolate mint flavors.

“Anna's Thins are also known as "Swedish wish cookies." To make a wish, place a cookie on the palm of your hand and tap it gently with your index finger. If it breaks into three pieces, your wish will come true.”

References

External links
  

Brand name cookies
Food and drink companies of Sweden
Purveyors to the Court of Sweden
Companies based in Stockholm County